The Battle of Ladyzhyn or Battle of Ładyżyn took place on July 18, 1672, during the Polish–Ottoman War (1672–76). It involved a 9,000 strong army, which consisted of Crimean Tatars and a unit of Zaporozhian Cossacks loyal to Petro Doroshenko against a pro-Polish regiment of the Cossack Hetman Mykhailo Khanenko. The forces met near Ladyzhyn, which at that time was called Ładyżyn.

Since Khanenko’s regiment numbered only 4,000 soldiers, he asked for help from the Castellan of Podlasie, Karol Luzecki, with 2,500 cavalry and dragoons. Khanenko and Luzecki joined forces on July 18, and marched towards the village of Czetwertynowka. Their army consisted of a traditional Cossack tabor in the center, Polish cavalry on both sides, and dragoons in the back. After a small skirmish, a Cossack unit loyal to Doroshenko was pushed beyond the Boh river. Polish cavalry continued the advance, but the opponent counterattacked, which resulted in heavy Polish losses.

The skirmish, due to the efforts of Khanenko and Luzecki, ended in a costly Ottoman-Cossack victory, as their losses were very high.

References 

 Mala Encyklopedia Wojskowa, 1967, Wydanie I

Conflicts in 1672
1672 in Europe
Ladyzno
Ladyzno
Ladyzno
Military history of Ukraine
Ladyzyn